In November 2005 President of Sri Lanka Chandrika Kumaratunga awarded national honours to 231 individuals for distinguished services. The awards ceremony was held on 14 November 2005 at the Bandaranaike Memorial International Conference Hall in Colombo.

Sri Lankabhimanya
Two individuals received the Sri Lankabhimanya honour:
 Arthur C. Clarke (1917–2008), writer
 Lakshman Kadirgamar (1932–2005), politician (posthumous)

Deshamanya
Thirty one individuals received the Deshamanya honour:
 William Alwis
 Mahesh Amalean (born 1955), engineer
 Sohli E. Captain
 Radhika Coomaraswamy (born 1953), diplomat
 Lalith de Mel
 Rohan de Saram (born 1939), musician
 Chandrananda de Silva
 Ashley de Vos, architect
  Jayaratne Banda Dissanayake
 M. T. A. Furkhan
 Basil Gunasekara (born 1929), soldier
 Cyril Herath (died 2011), police officer
 A. S. Jayawardena (1936–2018), economist
 Asoka Jayawardena, soldier
 Harry Jayawardena (born 1942), businessman
 Nihal Jinasena (born 1940), businessman
 Premasiri Khemadasa (1937–2008), composer
 W. D. Lakshman, economist
 Paddy Mendis (born 1933), air man
 Sunil Mendis, accountant
 J. B. Peiris, physician
 M. D. D. Peiris
 Denis Perera (1930–2013), soldier
 P. Ramanathan (1932–2006), judge
 P. Deva Rodrigo
 Mano Selvanathan
 A. H. Sheriffdeen, surgeon
 Roland Silva
 Bradman Weerakoon (born 1930), civil servant
 Kandekumara Hapudoragamage Jothiyarathna Wijayadasa
 Ray Wijewardene (1924–2010), engineer

Deshabandu
Thirty eight individuals received the Deshabandu honour:
 Tissa Abeysekara (1939–2009), filmmaker
 Joe Abeywickrama (1927–2011), actor
 A. L. M. Abusali
 Don Chandraprema Patrick Amarasinghe
 Sivaramalingam Anandacoomaraswamy
 Ranjit Atapattu (1933–2018), politician
 Senaka Dias Bandaranayake
 M. A. Careem
 Vajira Chithrasena
 Lyn de Alwis
 Lakshman de Mel
 Siran Upendra Deraniyagala (born 1942), archaeologist
 Tuley de Silva
 Tilak de Soysa
 A. E. T. Ellawala
 Lionel Fernando, civil servant
 Reginald George Bernard Forbes
 Olcott Gunasekera
 Kapila Gunawardena
 Jinadasa Guruge
 Macky Hashim
 Harold Herath (1930–2007), politician
 Indradasa Hettiarachchi, politician
 Osmund Jayaratne (1924–2006), academic
 S. D. R. Jayaratne
 Swarana Jayaweera
 Saddhamangala Karunaratne
 Stanley Kirinde
 A. N. S. Kulasinghe (1919–2006), engineer
 Vivendra Lintotawela
 N. Navaratnarajah
 Tony Ranasinghe (1937–2015), actor
 Diyanath Samarasinghe
 K. P. Silva
 Kirthi Tennakone, scientist
 C. G. Uragoda, physician
 D. P. Wickremasinghe
 Suriya Wickremasinghe

Veera Chudamani
One individual received the Veera Chudamani honour:
 Hettiarachchige Gamini Sirisoma Jayasekera

Vidya Jyothi
Thirteen individuals received the Vidya Jyothi honour:
 Damian Nobert Lakshman Alwis
 Janaka de Silva, academic
 Wijaya Godakumbura, surgeon
 Colvin Gunaratne
 A. D. S. Gunawardena
 Mohan Jayatilake
 Eric H. Karunanayake
 S. Mahalingam (1926–2015), academic
 E. W. Marasinghe
 Lalitha Mendis
 S. Mohanadas, academic
 Damitha Ramanayake
 Dayantha Wijeyesekera (born 1942), academic

Kala Keerthi
Forty two individuals received the Kala Keerthi honour:
 Tilak Abeysinghe
 Jackson Anthony (born 1958), actor
 Dharmasiri Bandaranayake (born 1949), film director
 S. Pani Bharatha (posthumous)
 A. J. Canagarathnam
 Olga de Livera
 Enid Anula Aluvihare de Silva
 Malini Fonseka (born 1947), actress
 T. B. Richard M. Don Gabriel
 Gnarathan
 Sanath Gunathilake (born 1955), actor
 Asoka Handagama, filmmaker
 Gamini Haththotuwegama (1939–2009), playwright
 Henry Jayasena (1931–2009), actor
 Vimukthi Jayasundara (born 1977), film director
 A. Jesurasa
 M. Kanakasabai
 Geetha Kumarasinghe (born 1955), actress
 Swarna Mallawarachchi, actress
 Jayalath Manoratne (born 1948), dramatist
 S. Maunaguru
 Carl Muller (born 1935), writer
 Sanath Nandasiri (born 1942), musician
 Simon Navagattegama (1940–2005), novelist (posthumous)
 Vasantha Obeysekera (1937–2017), film director
 Dharmasena Pathiraja (1943–2018), film director
 Sumitra Peries (born 1934), filmmaker
 Sri Jayana Rajapakse
 Tissa Ranasinghe (born 1925), artist
 Monica Ruwanpathirana (1946–2004), poet (posthumous)
 Pandithar Sachchithanantham
 Bharahmasri Sarveswara Sarma
 Shyam Selvadurai (born 1965), novelist
 Santhini Sevanesan
 Kulanthai M. Shunmugalingam
 A. Sivananthan
 K. Sivathamby (1932–2011), historian
 Somalatha Subasinghe (1936–2015), actress
 Prasanna Vithanage (born 1962), filmmaker
 Latha Walpola (born 1934), singer
 Rohana Weerasinghe (born 1949), musician
 Sybil Wettasinghe (born 1927), writer

Sri Lanka Sikhamani
Thirty six individuals received the Sri Lanka Sikhamani honour:
 R. I. T. Alles (1932–2013), teacher
 S. Arunachalam
 Mohamed Zainudeen Mohamed Badiudeen
 Jayantha Balawardena
 B. E. S. J. Bastiampillai
 J. M. S. Brito
 Kris Canekeratne
 Ferrin Careem
 Hiran Cooray
 S. D. Gunadasa (1931–2014), businessman
 Edgar Gunetunga
 Mallika Hemachandra
 H. Z. Jaffer
 J. K. D. S. H. Jayawardena
 Y. Karunadasa (born 1934), academic
 Gunadasa Kupuge (posthumous)
 Jayasiri Mendis
 Ameena Faiz Musthapa
 L. G. G. M. L. Mohammadu Naim
 Gunapala Nanayakkara
 Mahinda Palihawadana
 Kamala Peiris
 W. H. Piyadasa
 M. Ramalingam
 Daya Rathnayake
 Z. A. M. Refai
 Mendis Rohanadheera
 Manik Rodrigo
 Premila Senanayake
 Mahamood Rizwan Shahabdeen
 Suppiah Achari Thiagarajah
 Sanath Ukwatte
 Rodney Vandergert (1935–2009), diplomat
 Tony Weerasinghe
 Daya Weththasinghe
 Hiranthi Wijemanne

Vidya Nidhi
Thirteen individuals received the Vidya Nidhi honour:
 S. M. H. Sena Banda
 Raja Gnanasiri Hewa Bowala
 Niriellage Chandrasiri
 M. A. K. L. Dissanayake
 C. A. N. Fernando
 Angulugaha Gamage Lasath Namal Gamage
 Nimal Guanthilake
 P. Amitha Jayasinghe
 V. Kumar
 Shanthi Mendis
 Chales Santiapillai
 W. P. Siripala
 H. H. Subasinghe

Kala Suri
Thirty one individuals received the Kala Suri honour:
 Rohana Baddage
 Muhanned Nohideen Abdul Cader
 Sarath Chandrajeewa
 Pradeep Chandrasiri
 Somaratne Dissanayake, film director
 Udaya Shantha Fernando
 Edward Jayakody (born 1952), musician
 Pushpakumara Kandegedara
 Barbara Sansoni Lewcock
 Harsh Makalanda
 Dulip Gabada Mudalige
 Nelum Harasgama Nadaraja
 Parakrama Niriella
 M. A. Nuhuman
 Stanley Omar
 Janadasa Peiris
 H. A. Perera (1950–2010), actor
 Rohanadeva Perera
 Anoma Rajakaruna
 Anne Ranasinghe (1925–2016), poet
 Chitra Ranawake
 R. Rushankan
 Oosha Saravanamuttu
 Inoka Sathyangani, film director
 Rajini Selvanayagam
 T. Shanathanan
 Sumathy Sivamohan
 Chandraguptha Thenuwara
 Subramanium Vilvaratnam
 Jagath Weerasinghe (born 1954), artist
 Channa Wijewardena

Sri Lanka Thilaka
Four individuals received the Sri Lanka Thilaka honour:
 T. M. Priyantha Nimal de Silva
 Nayanatara Gitani Fonseka
 Rohana Upendra Kuruppu
 V. A. Thirugnanasuntharam

Sri Lanka Rathna
Nine individuals received the Sri Lanka Rathna honour:
 Bernard de Gaulle
 Tetsuya Hino
 Thilo W. Hoffmann
 Michael Morris (born 1936), British politician
 S. D. Muni
 Hosel Norota
 Michael Ondaatje (born 1943), Canadian poet
 N. Ram (born 1945), Indian journalist
 David C. Sanders

Sri Lanka Ranjana
Eleven individuals received the Sri Lanka Ranjana honour:
 Monica de Decker-Deprez
 Geoffrey Dobbs
 Romesh Gunesekera (born 1954), British author
 Evert Jongens
 Tadashi Noguchi
 Tridev Roy (1933–2012), Pakistani politician
 Wang Shihong
 Wolfgang Stange
 Baik Sung-hak
 Sung Woan-jong
 Robert Woods

References
 

Sri Lanka National Honours
National Honours
Civil awards and decorations of Sri Lanka